American hip hop duo Gang Starr have released seven studio albums, two compilation albums, thirty-one singles, one promotional single and nine music videos.

Albums

Studio albums

Compilation albums

Singles

Promotional singles

Guest appearances

Music videos

See also
 DJ Premier § Discography
 Guru discography

Notes

References

External links
 
 
 

Hip hop discographies
Discographies of American artists